The year 1985 involved some significant events.
Below is a list of television-related events of that year.

Events

Programs

Debuting this year

Resuming this year

Ending this year

Entering syndication

Changing networks

Made-for-TV movies and miniseries

Television stations

Station launches

Network affiliation changes

Station closures

Births

Deaths

See also
 1985 in the United States
 List of American films of 1985

References

External links
List of 1985 American television series at IMDb